The  Punta Nera  is a mountain of Savoie (France) and of the Province of Turin (Italy). It lies in the Cottian Alps range. It has an elevation of 3,047 metres above sea level.

Toponymy 
Its name (literally Black summit) comes from the dark colour of the shists prevailing in the mountain slopes facing Susa Valley. Also in French official maps the mountain is referred as Punta Nera.

Geography

The mountain is mainly made of detrital deposits and is the highest elevation of the Dora-Arc water divide between Colle della Rho (2,541 m) and Col du Fréjus (2,541 m). The mountain ends with two summits divided by a saddle at 3,017 m; the western one is the highest (3,047 m), while the eastern subsummit (3,041 m) overlooks Bardonecchia and is marked by a metallic summit cross. From the summit branches out a third ridge which connects the Punta Nera with the neighbouring Grand Argentier (3,042 m), totally in France.

SOIUSA classification 
According to SOIUSA (International Standardized Mountain Subdivision of the Alps) the mountain can be classified in the following way:
 main part = Western Alps
 major sector =  South Western Alps
 section = Cottian Alps
 subsection = Northern Cottian Alps	
 supergroup = 	Chaîne Bernaude-Pierre Menue-Ambin / Catena Bernauda-Pierre Menue-Ambin 
 group = Massif de la Roche Bernaude / Gruppo della Rocca Bernauda 
 subgroup = Crête de l'Argentier / Cresta Punta Nera-Grand Argentier 
 code = I/A-4.III-B.4.b

Access to the summit   

The normal route to access the mountain from its Italian side starts from Grange della Rho (Bardonecchia) and, after Piano dei Morti (at about 2,300 m), leaves the foothpath leading to the Colle della Rho and reaches the summit through its South-Western slopes, at first grassy and then bare and rocky.
From France the normal access route starts from Valfréjus (Modane); in wintertime some skilifts operating there can be used in order to shorten the climb. The mountain is also crossed by a quite demanding ski mountaineering route connecting Col du Fréjus with Colle della Rho.

Notes

Maps
 Italian official cartography (Istituto Geografico Militare - IGM); on-line version: www.pcn.minambiente.it
 French  official cartography (Institut Géographique National - IGN); on-line version:  www.geoportail.fr
 Istituto Geografico Centrale - Carta dei sentieri e dei rifugi scala 1:50.000 n. 1 Valli di Susa Chisone e Germanasca e 1:25.000 n. 104 Bardonecchia Monte Thabor Sauze d'Oulx

Mountains of Savoie
Mountains of Piedmont
Alpine three-thousanders
France–Italy border
International mountains of Europe
Mountains partially in France
Mountains partially in Italy
Three-thousanders of France
Three-thousanders of Italy